Chanie Rosenberg (20 April 1922 – June 2021) was a South African-born artist, former teacher and socialist.  She was the sister of Michael Kidron, the partner of Tony Cliff, and a founder member of the Socialist Workers Party in Britain.

Life
Chanie Rosenberg was born to a Jewish Zionist family originally from Lithuania in South Africa, a relative was the poet Isaac Rosenberg. She studied Hebrew at Cape Town University. In 1944, she moved to Palestine to live on a kibbutz where she became an anti-Zionist and a revolutionary socialist and met Yigael Gluckstein (better known as Tony Cliff). After the war, she moved to Britain where she was a member of the Revolutionary Communist Party from 1944 to 1949; afterwards joining the group which eventually became the Socialist Workers Party.  She was active in many anti-racist and anti-fascist mobilisations. She worked as a teacher who was active in the National Union of Teachers in Hackney. She was also an artist whose sculpture has been exhibited in the Royal Academy of Arts.

Selected writings
Education and Society: A rank-and-file pamphlet (1968)
Education and Revolution: a great experiment in socialist education (1972)
Class Size and the Relationship Between Official and Unofficial Action in the NUT (1977) 
Women and Perestroika (1989)
Education under capitalism and socialism (1991)
1919: Britain on the Brink of Revolution (1995)
Education: Why our children deserve better than New Labour (with Kevin Ovenden) (1999)
Fighting Fit: A Memoir (includes an illustrated pamphlet on Malevich and Revolution) (2013)

References

Further reading
 Ian Birchall Tony Cliff: A Marxist for his time (2011)

External links
Obituary of Chanie Rosenberg by Donny Gluckstein in Socialist Worker
Remembering Chanie Rosenberg in Socialist Worker
Chanie Rosenberg Internet Archive
Review of Fighting Fit
Image of Chanie Rosenberg and Tony Cliff

1922 births
2021 deaths
Anti-Zionist Jews
British Jewish writers
British political writers
British Trotskyists
International Socialist Tendency
Jewish socialists
Revolutionary Communist Party (UK, 1944) members
Socialist Workers Party (UK) members
South African Jews
South African emigrants to Mandatory Palestine
Mandatory Palestine emigrants to the United Kingdom